In October 2019, a 67-year-old man and his six adult children were discovered in Ruinerwold, a village in the Dutch province of Drenthe, who had lived for nine years in seclusion in a farm house where only the 58-year-old renter had been seen around.

Details about discovery
The adult children were thought to be aged 18 to 25. The family was found after the oldest child Israel, who has also called himself Jan, 25, left the house and spoke to local people in Ruinerwold. He had already become active on social media for a few months. His pictures show that he sometimes left the house after dark to go to the village. One of the children stated that they had never been to school. None of the six adult children were in official records of births and citizens.

The 67-year-old man has four more children, a total of ten children as of 2019. His eldest son was never a part of the same cult and the three eldest children of the nine he had with his second wife, fled the family home in 2011. Only the 6 youngest children remained in seclusion until 2019. The 67-year-old man has extensive Facebook pages and his own website, but does not mention his children. He tried to create an ecological utopia.

According to a court judgment in 2021, the father had suffered a cerebrovascular accident in 2016, rendering him incapable of making coherent communication.

Aftermath
On 17 October, the father appeared at court having been arrested and charged with unlawful deprivation of liberty, harming other people's health, and money laundering. In 2021 his prosecution was terminated because of his medical condition.

The 58-year-old man who rents the house, and was often around, but slept elsewhere, has also been arrested, initially for obstructing the police investigation, and later also suspected of complicity. They are not allowed any contact with the adult children, to avoid influencing them as witnesses and possible victims.

See also
List of solved missing person cases

References

External links 
Vader Gerrit Jan van D. en zijn kinderen in de schuilboerderij in Ruinerwold: de feiten op een rij 

2010s missing person cases
Apocalyptic groups
Formerly missing people
Hermits
Living people
Missing person cases in Europe
Year of birth missing (living people)